= Indian Brook Assemblage =

- Indian Brook
- Location within New York
- Nearest city: Goldens Bridge
- Coordinates: 41.29°N 73.63°W
- Area: 130 acres (53 ha)
- Established: 1975
- Website: fieldguide.lewisborolandtrust.org/preserves/indian-brook-assemblage/

The Indian Brook Assemblage is located in Westchester County, New York. The three distinct preserves are managed by the Lewisboro Land Trust. The assemblage has above 130 acres and 4.5 miles of trails. The assemblage was established in 1975 and has since then grown.
